Jakub Skrzyniarz (born 6 June 1996) is a Polish handball player for CD Bidasoa and the Polish national team.

References

1996 births
Living people
People from Głogów
Sportspeople from Lower Silesian Voivodeship
Polish male handball players